Ilias Lappas (born 1981) is Greek water polo player. Lappas played for Greek powerhouse Olympiacos with whom he won the 2001–02 LEN Champions League in Budapest. Lappas was part of the Olympiacos squad that won the 2002 Triple Crown (LEN Champions League, Greek Championship, Greek Cup).

References

External links
 Παρουσιάστηκε και υπέγραψε στον ΝΟΠ ο αθλητής Ηλίας Λάππας (in Greek) 

1981 births
Living people
Olympiacos Water Polo Club players
Greek male water polo players